Rothamsted may refer to:

Rothamsted Manor, a former manor near Harpenden in English county of Hertfordshire.
Rothamsted Park, a public park in Harpenden in English county of Hertfordshire.
Rothamsted Research, an English agricultural research institution, formerly known as Rothamsted Experimental Station.